Saint Victor Catholic Church, located at 8634 Holloway Drive, is a Roman Catholic church in West Hollywood, California.

History
The parish was founded in 1906. It has served many different parishioners: oilmen and railway workers, film industry figures, post-World War II families, gay men, etc. From 1992 to 1994, Archbishop George Hugh Niederauer lived in the church. The funeral for John Edward 'Jack' Reagan, father of President Ronald Reagan, was held at this church.

The adjacent St Victor's school closed in the 1970s and its building is leased to a private, non-sectarian school, the Pacific Hills School.

Use as a movie filming location 
The exterior of the church is used in Ben & Arthur.

References

Roman Catholic churches in Los Angeles
Buildings and structures in West Hollywood, California
Churches in Los Angeles County, California